The 2017–18 Indian Super League season was the fourth season of the Indian Super League, one of the top Indian professional football leagues. It was established in 2013. The regular season started on 17 November 2017 and ended on 4 March 2018, The finals began on 7 March 2018, concluding with the final on 17 March 2018. ATK were the defending champions from the 2016 season, however they could not advance to the playoffs. Chennaiyin won their second Indian Super League title by defeating Bengaluru 3–2 in the final.

Two new sides joined the league as expansion teams: Bengaluru and Jamshedpur. The two new clubs are the ninth and tenth teams in the league. This made it the first edition of the ISL in which there are more than eight teams participating. As well as expanding two teams, the league also expanded two more months, being played in five months instead of three.

Teams

Stadiums and locations

Expansion
On 11 May 2017, it was announced by the Indian Super League organizers, Football Sports Development, that they would be inviting bids for new teams to join the league for the upcoming season. The bids would be for ten cities, namely Ahmedabad, Bengaluru, Cuttack, Durgapur, Hyderabad, Jamshedpur, Kolkata, Ranchi, Siliguri and Thiruvananthapuram. It was also clarified that if Kolkata were to win at least one bid for a team, the new "Kolkata" side would have to play away from the city for two seasons.

On 25 May 2017, it was announced that bidding for new teams had ended and that the league's appointed external validator would look over the bids. It was also announced that Bengaluru, the two-time champion of the I-League, India's top-tier professional football league, had submitted a bid. Two weeks later, on 12 June, it was officially announced that Bengaluru (for Bangalore) and Tata Group (for Jamshedpur) had won the bids for the new teams.

Personnel and sponsorship

Head coaching changes

Roster changes

Overseas players
Unlike during the first three seasons of the Indian Super League, the 2017–18 season saw the maximum number of foreign players per team reduced to eight from 11. Also unlike the previous three seasons, the maximum number of foreigners allowed on the pitch at the same time was reduced to five from six.

Regular season

Results

Playoffs

Bracket

Semi-finals

Final

Season statistics

Scoring

Top scorers

Top Indian scorers

Hat-tricks

Assists

Cleansheets

Discipline

 Most yellow cards (club): 47
 Chennaiyin

 Most red cards (club): 4
 Delhi Dynamos

 Most yellow cards (player): 9
  Dhanpal Ganesh (Chennaiyin)

 Most red cards (player): 2
  Pratik Chowdhary (Delhi Dynamos)

Average home attendances

Awards
Source: Indian Super League website

Hero of the Match

Emerging Player of the Match

Fans' Player of the Month

Fans' Team of the Season

End-of-season awards

See also

 2017–18 ATK season
 2017–18 Bengaluru FC season
 2017–18 Chennaiyin FC season
 2017–18 Delhi Dynamos FC season
 2017–18 FC Goa season
 2017–18 FC Pune City season
 2017–18 Jamshedpur FC season
 2017–18 Kerala Blasters FC season
 2017–18 Mumbai City FC season
 2017–18 NorthEast United FC season

References

External links
Official website

 
Indian Super League seasons
1
India